Kopcie  is a village in the administrative district of Gmina Domanice, within Siedlce County, Masovian Voivodeship, in east-central Poland.

The village has a population of 330.

References

Kopcie